The Festival del Viaggio (in English: Travel festival) is an annual cultural festival held each June in Florence, Viareggio or Palermo (Italy). The festival features a vast array of conferences, exhibitions, concerts, movies, and documentaries about traveling. It also organizes workshops on writing and photography about travel, in collaborations with the University of Pisa and the province of Florence. It was the first of its kind in Italy.

History 
The festival was founded in 2006 by writer Alessandro Agostinelli, who is the current director.

In 2009 Festival del Viaggio won the "Brand New Italian Festival Award" in Bologna.
In 2010 the festival presented a walk in the Florentine sky: the tightrope walker Andrea Loreni walked on the wire 50 meters high over Piazza della Signoria, entering into the Palazzo Vecchio. In 2011 festival organized a photo contest about honeymoons all over the world, in collaborations with the weekly magazine L'Espresso and the daily newspaper La Repubblica. In 2018 the Festival del Viaggio conceived and realized the plan of the 'Passeggiata Jodorowski', a walk at dawn amongst the most important Florentine monuments going always straight and never turning (inspired by Alejandro Jodorowski's idea). In September 2019 Viareggio was chosen as an additional seat.

The 2020 edition was postponed to September and arranged with more open-air and on-line events.

Prominent guests
The following people were involved to describe their experience as travellers

Bandabardò
Alessandro Benvenuti 
Giulio Borrelli
Vinicio Capossela 
Franco Cardini
Paolo Crepet
Marcella Croce
Philippe Daverio
Tiziano Fratus
Wlodek Goldkorn
Lucia Goracci
Paolo Hendel 
Annet Henneman
Marino Magliani
Dacia Maraini
Paolo Migone
Luigi Nacci
Riccardo Onori
David Riondino
Patrizio Roversi
Beppe Severgnini
Sergio Staino
Elena Torre
Giorgio Van Straten
Marco Vichi
Sergey Yastrzhembsky

References

External links

Cultural festivals in Italy
Summer festivals
Florence
Tourist attractions in Tuscany
Recurring events established in 2006
2006 establishments in Italy
Tourism in Italy